Flippity and Flop are a pair of cartoon characters, an anthropomorphic cat and canary duo. They appeared in theatrical shorts from 1945 to 1947 by Screen Gems for Columbia Pictures. The characters were voiced by Harry E. Lang, while Flop has a speaking role in Cagey Bird and Silent Tweetment by Frank Graham and Flippity in the end of Big House Blues by Bill Shaw.

The antics of Flop the cat and Flippity the Canary were similar to that of Tweety and Sylvester of Warner Bros. However unlike Tweety, Flippity had to rely on Sam the household Dog to protect him from Flop. Flippity and Flop only appeared in four cartoons before Screen Gems was replaced by United Productions of America in 1948 with Screen Gems final cartoon releasing the following year. Their popularity never reached that of Columbia's biggest cartoon stars, The Fox and the Crow. Flippity and Flop lived on only in comic books published by DC Comics until 1962.

References

External links
Flippity and Flop at Don Markstein's Toonopedia. Archived from the original on July 30, 2016.

Film characters introduced in 1945
Fictional anthropomorphic characters
Animated duos
Columbia cartoons series and characters
Screen Gems film series
Fictional cats
Fictional canaries